Augusto Gómez Villanueva (born 23 July 1929) is a Mexican politician affiliated with the Institutional Revolutionary Party. He served as Senator of the XLVIII and XLIX Legislatures of the Mexican Congress representing Aguascalientes and as Deputy of the XLVI, L, LIV, LVI, and LVIII Legislatures.

He was the President of the Chamber of Deputies in 1965.

References

1929 births
Living people
Politicians from Aguascalientes
Members of the Senate of the Republic (Mexico)
Members of the Chamber of Deputies (Mexico)
Presidents of the Chamber of Deputies (Mexico)
Institutional Revolutionary Party politicians
20th-century Mexican politicians
21st-century Mexican politicians
People from Aguascalientes City
National Autonomous University of Mexico alumni